"I Love You Goodbye" is the first track on the fourth Thomas Dolby album Astronauts & Heretics. It was the second of three singles to be released from the album and reached number 36 in the UK singles chart in July 1992.

Done in the style of a "Cajun Techno," the song was explained by Dolby on his live album Forty: Live Limited Edition to be a semi-autobiographical narrative of an adventure in New Orleans. The narrator decides to go bowling on a Friday morning, recalling an incident in which he and an acquaintance stole a car (a Datsun) and drove toward the Everglades. They were arrested after crashing the car in a rainstorm, but the county sheriff offered to let them go in exchange for a bribe as long as they got rid of the car in the Gulf of Mexico.

The song erroneously places the Everglades in the state of Louisiana. They are located several hundred miles to the southeast in the state of Florida. In addition, the song refers to a county sheriff; in reality, Louisiana is divided into parishes.

Track listings
7" (VS 1417)
 I Love You Goodbye (Edited Version)
 Eastern Bloc (Edited Version)

CD 1 (VSCDG 1417)
 I Love You Goodbye (Edited Version)
 Eastern Bloc (Edited Version)
 I Love You Goodbye (Version)
 Eastern Bloc (Version)

CD 2 (VSCDT 1417)
 I Love You Goodbye
 Windpower
 Europa and the Pirate Twins
 Eastern Bloc (Edited Version)

Thomas Dolby songs
1992 singles
1992 songs
Giant Records (Warner) singles
Songs written by Thomas Dolby